Patricia Elia Ariza Flórez (born January 25, 1946) is a Colombian poet, playwright, actor and current Minister of Culture of the Government of Petro.

Life and career 
On the run from violence, her family arrived in the Colombian capital of Bogotá in 1948. During her youth she was grasped by Nadaism in Medellín, together with, among others, Gonzalo Arango. Around the same time, at the end of the sixties, she joined the Military Communist Youth (Juco), being influenced by her future husband Santiago García. In 1992 she left Juco, meanwhile she had left García in this time.

In 1966, she and García founded the culture house Casa de la Cultura, which was renamed to Teatro La Candelaria later. This was the first alternative theater in Colombia. From 1967 to 1969 she studied Art History at the faculty of Fine Arts of the National University of Colombia in Bogota.

Ariza distinguishes herself in the theatrical world for her special approach which focuses on promoting social interaction and reducing conflicts. For instance,  she shows women that left their houses because of violence, elderly, or market salesmen, by letting them tell their life stories and giving them an active role in the development of the narrative. In her scripts their problems play an important role.

In 1991 she invited the feminist María Evelia Marmolejo to reconstruct her performance "11 de Marzo" in commemoration of the International Women's Day along with the dance group Flores de Otoño, with who she later founded La Escuela de Mujeres En Escena por la Paz in 2018. The performance ended with a group of dancers covering Simón Bolívar's statue in the Plaza de Bolivar with a cloth that had traces of menstrual blood. It resulted in strong reactions from people who were walking by and yelled at her to take it down. This event was invented by dancers in present time.

In 2009 the culture scene was shattered by the accusation in a secret police dossier, that claimed she had done her work only as a cover to spread mass propaganda for the communist rebel movement FARC.

In 2007 she was honored with a Culture and conflict Prince Claus Award from the Netherlands for "her outstanding work over decades to empower the disadvantaged, enabling them to transform their lives through cultural activities, for her efforts to counteract injustice and restore social memory, and for her energetic commitment to the reduction of conflict."

In 2014 Ariza was honored by the League of Professional Theatre Women (LPTW) in New York City with the Gilder/Coigney International Theatre Award. The LPTW Gilder/Coigney International Theatre Award, presented every three years, was established in 2011 in honor of Rosamond Gilder and Martha Coigney, two legendary theatre women known for their work on the international stage, to acknowledge the exceptional work of theatre women around the world. The award was presented to Ariza in New York City in October 2014 at a ceremony at the Martin E. Segal Theatre Center, of the Graduate Center, CUNY, and was accompanied by a week of events and workshops with her or celebrating her work.

Bibliography 
Ariza was the coauthor of many works. She published a number alone as well, of which the following is a selection:
 1986: El viento y la ceniza
 1981: La alegría de leer
 1984: Tres mujeres y prevert.
 1989: Mujeres en trance de viaje
 1991: La Kukhualina
 1991: Onic; Mi Parce
 1992: 400 Assa
 1994: La calle y el parche
 1992-1993: Seran Diablos o Qué Seran
 1993: Maria Magdalena,
 1993: Luna menguante
 1995: Opera Rap
 1996: Del cielo a la tierra
 1996: Proyecto Emily
 1997: A fuego lento
 1998: Danza mayor
 1999: La madre
 1992: Medea Hungara
 2000-2001: Antégona
 2001: Los nadaístas
 2000: Mujeres desplazándos
 2001: Camilo vive
 2012: Soma Mnemosine

Filmography 
The following is a selection of her roles as an actress:
2006: Antígona
2003: Gran Hermano Colombia
Amar y vivir
Guadalupe años sin cuenta
The following is a selection of her roles as a director:
2006: Antígona
El viento y la ceniza

References 

|-

Colombian film actresses
Colombian film directors
Colombian women film directors
Living people
1948 births
People from Santander Department
National University of Colombia alumni
People from Bogotá
Cabinet of Gustavo Petro
20th-century Colombian actresses
21st-century Colombian actresses
Colombian women poets
Colombian dramatists and playwrights
20th-century Colombian writers
20th-century Colombian women writers
21st-century Colombian women writers
21st-century Colombian writers
21st-century Colombian politicians
21st-century Colombian women politicians